Neuhäusel or Neuhaeusel may refer to:
 Alsace
 Neuhaeusel, a commune in the Bas-Rhin department in Alsace in north-eastern France
 Germany
 Neuhäusel, an Ortsgemeinde in the Westerwaldkreis in Rhineland-Palatinate, Germany
 Slovakia
 Nové Zámky
 Liptovský Hrádok